Bert and Arnie's Guide to Friendship is a 2013 American comedy film directed by Jeff Kaplan and starring Matt Oberg, Stephen Schneider and Anna Chlumsky.  It is Kaplan's directorial debut.

Cast
Matt Oberg as Bert
Stephen Schneider as Arnie
Anna Chlumsky as Sabrina
Adrian Martinez as Ernesto
Cristin Milioti as Faye
Debargo Sanyal as Wesley
Bree Sharp as Erica
Emily Ackerman as Jane

Reception
The film has a 33% rating on Rotten Tomatoes.

References

External links
 
 

American comedy films
2013 directorial debut films
2013 films
2010s English-language films
2010s American films